Chelsea Hotel may refer to:
Hotel Chelsea in New York City
Chelsea Hotel (Atlantic City) in Atlantic City, New Jersey
"Chelsea Hotel No. 2", a song from the 1974 Leonard Cohen album New Skin for the Old Ceremony
Chelsea Hotel, a book of photographs by Claudio Edinger, published in 1983
Chelsea Hotel, Toronto

See also
Chelsea Horror Hotel, a 2001 novel written by Dee Dee Ramone